Great Brook Farm State Park is a public, day-use recreation area featuring an active dairy farm in the town of Carlisle, Massachusetts, USA. The state park, which was established in 1967, is managed by the Department of Conservation and Recreation.

Activities and amenities
The park has  of trails for hiking, mountain biking, cross-country skiing, dog-walking and equestrian use. Canoeing and fishing are offered on Meadow Pond. Tours of the dairy farm are available from May to October. An ice cream stand is open from April to October.

From December to March, the Great Brook Ski Touring Center, located in the park, grooms the park's trails for cross-country skiing and rents skis and snowshoes.

Gallery

References

External links
Summer trail map Department of Conservation and Recreation
Winter trail map Department of Conservation and Recreation

State parks of Massachusetts
Massachusetts natural resources
Parks in Middlesex County, Massachusetts
1967 establishments in Massachusetts
Protected areas established in 1967
Carlisle, Massachusetts